Montalto Dora Castle ( is a castle located in Montalto Dora, Piedmont, Italy.

History 
The castle was built in the first half of the 12th century on top of Monte Crovero reflecting in the waters of Lake Pistono, being first mentioned under the name of castrum monsalti in a document dating from 1140. 

During the 14th and 15th century, the castle was modified and enlarged to better serve from a defensive viewpoint.

In the 19th century, the castle was renovated under the direction of architects Carlo Nigra and Alfredo d'Andrade, who also used it as a model and source of inspiration when designing the Borgo Medioevale in Turin.

References

External links

Official Website——

Castles in Piedmont